Westworld: Season 1 is the first soundtrack of the American television series Westworld, composed by Ramin Djawadi. Released on December 5, 2016, the album includes thirty-four pieces composed or arranged for the show. The album contains mostly original compositions by Djawadi, it also includes some covers by him of Radiohead,  The Rolling Stones, Soundgarden, The Animals, and The Cure. The soundtrack has received favorable reviews and peaked at #190 on the U.S. Billboard 200 chart. It was nominated for International Film Music Critics Association for "Best Original Score for a Television Series".

An EP titled Westworld: Season 1 (Selections from the HBO Series), containing the tracks "Main Title Theme – Westworld", "Black Hole Sun", "Paint It, Black", "No Surprises", and "A Forest", was released in advance on October 31, 2016.

Track listing
All music by Ramin Djawadi, except where noted.

Charts

Awards and nominations

References 

2016 soundtrack albums
Ramin Djawadi soundtracks
Television soundtracks
WaterTower Music soundtracks
Soundtrack